Abiqua (MC hull 548) was laid down on 18 June 1943 by the Alabama Drydock and Shipbuilding Company, Mobile, Alabama.; launched on 22 September 1943; sponsored by Mrs. George Bliss Jones; and delivered to the Cities Service Company for operation on 31 October 1943.

Abiqua was among the ships transferred by the Maritime Administration to the Navy in response to the Suez crisis of 1956. She was accepted by the Military Sea Transportation Service (MSTS) on 21 December 1956 but operated for MSTS by a civilian crew under contract with a commercial firm listed as Matra-lines, but not further identified.

As the crisis subsided, Abiqua was returned to the Maritime Administration and struck from the Navy list on 30 September 1957. Following her deactivation, Abiqua returned to the Alabama Drydock and Shipbuilding Co., Mobile, Ala. The afterpart of Abiqua was joined to the forepart of SS Windsor (formerly Bear Paw) to form a dry cargo ship which retained the name Abiqua. The old forepart of Abiqua was joined to the afterpart of Windsor to form a storage vessel which was renamed Bear Paw. The bow and midbody from Abiqua were towed to the Bethlehem Beaumont Shipyard., at Beaumont, Tex., and converted into a tank barge, which was renamed Tide Mar XIX.

References
 navsource: T-AO-158 Abiqua
 
 T2tanker.org: Abiqua

Type T2-SE-A1 tankers
Ships built in Mobile, Alabama
1943 ships
World War II tankers of the United States